Kurash at the 2009 Asian Indoor Games was held in Gia Lâm Gymnasium, Hanoi, Vietnam from 2 November to 4 November 2009.

Medalists

Men

Women

Medal table

Results

Men

60 kg
2 November

66 kg
3 November

73 kg
3 November

81 kg
4 November

90 kg
4 November

Women

52 kg
2 November

57 kg
3 November

63 kg
4 November

References
 Official site

2009 Asian Indoor Games events
2009